Ezekiel Candler "Took" Gathings (November 10, 1903 – May 2, 1979) was a U.S. Representative from Arkansas, representing Arkansas' First Congressional District from 1939 to 1969. A segregationist conservative, Gathings was an ally of Strom Thurmond, and stood against all civil rights legislation. Gathings also chaired the 1952 House Select Committee on Current Pornographic Materials, which advocated for censorship of obscene magazines, books, and comics.

Early life and education 
Born in Prairie, Mississippi, Gathings' family moved to Earle, Arkansas when Gathings was school-aged.

His nickname derived from Gathings' younger brother's mispronunciation of his childhood nickname, "Sugar" ("Tooker", shortened to "Took").

Gathings graduated from high school in Earle, and briefly attended University of Alabama, before transferring to the University of Arkansas School of Law, where he graduated in 1929. He was admitted to the bar the same year and commenced practice in Helena, Arkansas, moving his practice to West Memphis, in 1932.

Political career 
Gathings served in the Arkansas Senate from 1935–1939, representing Crittenden and St. Francis Counties. He served in the 50th and 51st Arkansas General Assembly, which were entirely Democratic during the Solid South period. He was elected as a Democrat (defeating incumbent William J. Driver in the 1938 Democratic primary) to the Seventy-sixth and to the fourteen succeeding Congresses (January 3, 1939 – January 3, 1969) as a representative of Arkansas' 1st Congressional District. He was a signatory of the 1956 Southern Manifesto that opposed the desegregation of public schools ordered by the Supreme Court in Brown v. Board of Education.

Gathings resided in West Memphis, Arkansas, where he died May 2, 1979. He was interred in Crittenden Memorial Park, Marion, Arkansas.

References

 

1903 births
1979 deaths
American segregationists
People from Monroe County, Mississippi
Democratic Party Arkansas state senators
Democratic Party members of the United States House of Representatives from Arkansas
People from West Memphis, Arkansas
20th-century American politicians
Old Right (United States)